The Hawke's Bay rugby league team are a New Zealand rugby league team that represents the Hawke's Bay Rugby League in New Zealand Rugby League competitions. They are nicknamed the Unicorns. They competed in the Lion Red Cup between 1994 and 1996.

Lion Red Cup
The team competed in all three seasons of the Lion Red Cup but were not very successful, twice finishing ninth out of the twelve teams. Mike Dorreen was part of the 1994 Unicorns side that was coached by Gary Kemble.

References

New Zealand rugby league teams
Rugby league in the Hawke's Bay